Allan Hotchkin (7 February 1943 – 25 February 2023) was an Australian rules footballer who played for the South Melbourne Football Club in the Victorian Football League (VFL).

Notes

External links 

1943 births
2023 deaths
Australian rules footballers from Victoria (Australia)
Sydney Swans players